Deportivo Sanarate is a Guatemalan football club from Sanarate, El Progreso Department. It was founded in 1958 and currently plays in the Liga Nacional de Fútbol de Guatemala, top tier on their football.

History 

They were first promoted to the highest level in their history in 1959, one year after their foundation but were relegated three years later. Subsequently they competed in lower divisions until they reached promotion to Segunda División de Ascenso in 1990.

Current squad

List of coaches
 Bartolo Márquez
 Ariel Mena (2006-2008)
  Héctor Julián Trujillo (-Oct 2017)
 Horacio Cordero (Oct 2017-Dec 2017) 
 Pablo Centrone (Dec 2017-Oct 2018)
 Hector Julian Trujillo (Oct 2018-Feb 2019)
 Ariel Sena (Feb 2019-2019)
 Rafael Díaz Aitkenhead (2019-2020)
 Gabriel Castillo (2020)
 Matías Tatangelo (2021)
 Irvin Olivares (2021)
 Jorge Sumich (2021)
 Víctor Gómez (2021- )

References

External links
http://www.misanarate.com/?page_id=1869
http://el.soccerway.com/teams/guatemala/deportivo-sanarate/34388/
http://www.fedefutguate.org/

Football clubs in Guatemala
Association football clubs established in 1958
1958 establishments in Guatemala